Sanga cattle is the collective name for indigenous cattle of sub-Saharan Africa. They are sometimes identified as a subspecies with the scientific name Bos taurus africanus. Their history of domestication and their origins in relation to taurine cattle, zebu cattle, and native African varieties of the ancestral aurochs are a matter of debate.

Origins and classification

Near Eastern Introduction of Domesticated Cattle Into Africa

The timeline for their history is the subject of extensive debate. A combination of genetic studies with archaeological research, including cultural history, has clarified the question of the complex origin of African cattle in recent years. Thus African cattle descend firstly from an aurochs domesticated in the Near East. After their introduction to Egypt, about eight thousand years ago, they spread all over the Sahara which was then still green, up to West Africa. The north African pastoralists interbred their domestic cattle with wild African Aurochs of various regional races, both in the paternal and maternal lines over a long time, which is reflected in the genetic distinctness of African cattle from both European / near Eastern and from Indian Zebu cattle. Hereby special adaptations to the African climate and conditions were introduced, that characterise African cattle - both those deriving solely from Aurochs and the Sanga cattle with their Zebu admixture. Morphological features of early African cattle, such as lyre-shaped horns, are depicted on murals of Ancient Egypt. Some authors date the first Sanga cattle, which originated through by crossing in of Zebu bulls in northeast and east Africa, from 1600 BCE onward. They are distinguished by having small cervicothoracic humps, that are typical for (wild) Aurochs, instead of the high thoracic humps which characterize the Zebu.

Rather than the domesticating of cattle happening in the region of the Tadrart Acacus, it is considered more likely that domesticated cattle were introduced to the region. Cattle are thought to not have entered Africa independently, but rather, are thought to have been brought into Africa by cattle pastoralists. By the end of the 8th millennium BP, domesticated cattle are thought to have been brought into the Central Sahara. The Central Sahara (e.g., Tin Hanakaten, Tin Torha, Uan Muhuggiag, Uan Tabu) was a major intermediary area for the distribution of domesticated animals from the Eastern Sahara to the Western Sahara.

Based on cattle remains near the Nile dated to 9000 BP and cattle remains near Nabta Playa and Bir Kiseiba reliably dated to 7750 BP, domesticated cattle may have appeared earlier, near the Nile, and then expanded to the western region of the Sahara. Though undomesticated aurochs are shown, via archaeological evidence and rock art, to have dwelled in Northeast Africa, aurochs are thought to have been independently domesticated in India and the Near East. After aurochs were domesticated in the Near East, cattle pastoralists may have migrated, along with domesticated aurochs, through the Nile Valley and, by 8000 BP, through Wadi Howar, into the Central Sahara.

The mitochondrial divergence of undomesticated Indian cattle, European cattle, and African cattle (Bos  primigenius) from one another in 25,000 BP is viewed as evidence supporting the conclusion that cattle may have been domesticated in Northeast Africa, particularly, the eastern region of the Sahara, between 10,000 BP and 8000 BP. Cattle (Bos) remains may date as early as 9000 BP in Bir Kiseiba and Nabta Playa. While the mitochondrial divergence between Eurasian and African cattle in 25,000 BP can be viewed as supportive evidence for cattle being independently domesticated in Africa, introgression from undomesticated African cattle in Eurasian cattle may provide an alternative interpretation of this evidence.

Independent Domestication of African Cattle In Africa

These cattle originated in East Africa, probably the western shores of Lake Victoria, and have spread down the river Nile (i.e. northwards), with depictions on Ancient Egyptian murals. Sanga are an intermediate type, probably formed by hybridizing the indigenous humpless cattle with Zebu cattle. However, archaeological evidence indicates this cattle type was domesticated independently in Africa, and bloodlines of taurine and zebu cattle were introduced only within the last few hundred years. 

The time and location for when and where cattle were domesticated in Africa remains to be resolved.

Indian humped cattle (Bos indicus) and North African/Middle Eastern taurine cattle (Bos taurus) are commonly assumed to have admixed with one another, resulting in Sanga cattle as their offspring. Rather than accept the common assumption, admixture with taurine and humped cattle is viewed as having likely occurred within the last few hundred years, and Sanga cattle are viewed as having originated from among African cattle within Africa. Regarding possible origin scenarios for Sub-Saharan African Sanga cattle, domesticated taurine cattle were introduced into North Africa, admixed with undomesticated African cattle (Bos primigenius opisthonomous), resulting in offspring (the oldest being the Egyptian/Sudanese longhorn, some to all of which are viewed as Sanga cattle), or more likely, domesticated African cattle originated in Africa (including Egyptian longhorn), and became regionally diversified (e.g., taurine cattle in North Africa, zebu cattle in East Africa).

The managing of Barbary sheep may be viewed as parallel evidence for the domestication of amid the early period of the Holocene. Near Nabta Playa, in the Western Desert, between 11th millennium cal BP and 10th millennium cal BP, semi-sedentary African hunter-gatherers may have independently domesticated African cattle as a form of reliable food source and as a short-term adaptation to the dry period of the Green Sahara, which resulted in a limited availability of edible flora. African Bos primigenius fossils, which have been dated between 11th millennium cal BP and 10th millennium cal BP, have been found at Bir Kiseiba and Nabta Playa.

In the Western Desert, at the E-75-6 archaeological site, amid 10th millennium cal BP and 9th millennium cal BP, African pastoralists may have managed North African cattle (Bos primigenius) and continually used the watering basin and well and as water source. In the northern region of Sudan, at El Barga, cattle fossils found in a human burial serve as supportive evidence for cattle being in the area.

While this does not negate that it is possible for cattle from the Near East to have migrated into Africa, a greater number of African cattle in the same area share the T1 mitochondrial haplogroup and atypical haplotypes than in other areas, which provides support for Africans independently domesticating African cattle. Based on a small sample size (SNPs from sequences of whole genomes), African cattle split early from European cattle (Taurine). African cattle, bearing the Y2 haplogroup, form a sub-group within the overall group of taurine cattle. As a Near Eastern origin of African cattle requires a conceptual bottleneck to sustain the view, the diverseness of the Y2 haplogroup and T1 haplogroup do not support the view of a bottleneck having occurred, and thus, does not support a Near Eastern origin for African cattle. Altogether, these forms of genetic evidence provide the strongest support for Africans independently domesticating African cattle.

Breeds of Sanga cattle

Pure Sanga cattle

Sanga cattle (Bos taurus africanus x Bos indicus)
 Anugak
 Raya Azebo
 Abigar
 Afrikaner
 Aliab Dinka
 Ankole (Original African type)
 Drakensberger cattle
 Nguni
 Red Fulani
 Tuli
 Tswana
 White Fulani cattle
 Borgou 
 Keteku 
 Méré cattle 
 Ghana Sanga 
 Diali 
 Biu  
 Humpless Shorthorns

Zenga cattle

Zenga = (Zebu x Sanga) 
 Afar cattle
 Arado (of Ethiopia)
 Fogera (of Ethiopia)
 Horro (of Ethiopia)
 Jiddu (southern Somalia)
 Alur, also called Nioka (Nyoka) or
Blukwa cattle (Democratic Republic of Congo);
 Nganda (Uganda)
 Sukuma (Tanzania)
 Tete (Mozambique)

Composite cattle breeds

(Bos taurus africanus x Bos indicus X Bos taurus europaeus)

 Ankole-Watusi (Modern American breed) developed by crossing in of European cattle.
 Bonsmara (A breed developed in the 1940s in South Africa by using five-eighths Afrikaner or 62,5% African Bos Taurus)
 Rana and Renitelo of Madagascar 
  Mpwapwa of Tanzania

Pure African taurus cattle

(Bos taurus taurus × Bos primigenius africanus)
 N'dama
 Kuri cattle
 Lagune or Dahomey cattle
 Ghana shorthorn and Ghana dwarf shorthorn 
 Baoule cattle
 Somba cattle 
 Kapsiki cattle 
 Namchi cattle
 Bakosi cattle 
 Muturu cattle 
 Forest or Dwarf Muturu (Liberian Dwarf Muturu, Ghanaian Dwarf Muturu, Nigerian Dwarf Muturu) 
 Savanna Muturu
 Humpless Shorthorns

Trypanotolerance in Sanga cattle

Trypanosomiasis poses a considerable constraint on livestock agricultural development in Tsetse fly infested areas of sub Saharan Africa, especially in west and central Africa. International research conducted by ILRI in Nigeria, the Democratic Republic of the Congo and Kenya has shown that the N'Dama is the most resistant breed. In Nigeria, research has shown that N'Dama is up to 2-3x (or 25%) more resistant than Nguni cattle. And F1 N'Dama x Nguni 16.5% better than pure Nguni. While in Kenya research conducted by KALRO has shown a similarity with crossbreeding N'Dama x Boran cattle.

References

Cattle
Cattle breeds originating in Cameroon
Cattle breeds originating in Ethiopia
Cattle breeds originating in Kenya
Cattle breeds originating in Nigeria
Cattle breeds originating in South Africa
Cattle breeds originating in Zimbabwe